Henry Irwin (1773–1858) was Archdeacon of Emly  from 1843 until 1858.

Irwin was born in Drogheda, County Louth, Ireland and educated at Trinity College, Dublin.  He was the Minister at Sandford Chapel, Dublin before his appointment as Archdeacon.

His son was also an archdeacon; and his grandson  was an architect of British India.

References

Irish Anglicans
Alumni of Trinity College Dublin
Archdeacons of Emly
1773 births
1858 deaths